'deFENCE' is an interactive conceptual art project for freedom of cohabitation, designed in such a way as to include each beholder personally. In tradition of Marcel Duchamp, the two main roles of this exhibit are the work itself, and the person watching it. Only here, the subjective role of the beholder is not the only one. They are personally drawn into the exhibit, by way of a mirror. 
The work represents a house, with its door wide open, inviting and welcoming every visitor. Except, a certain visitor is watching this house over a barbed wire fence. On the other hand, this visitor is being watched from the window of the house. The author's intention was to combine these two persons into one, so that people who had never had the chance to be on the other side of the barbed wire, can benefit in two ways: Firstly, they can see how it is to be looking over a barbed wire into a house inviting you, which you cannot reach. And secondly, they can see themselves passively looking from the house at the person outside the fence, doing nothing to remove this segregation.

The concept of this project is to bring to the attention of people living in the 'free' world that many of the boundaries that segregate others in a 'non free' world, are created by themselves. Or, at least, they do nothing to remove these boundaries.
The wish of the author is to help remove all boundaries that separate people and worlds.

Note: 'deFENCE' project was created by Gregor Marković from Serbia, in January 2006. It has been selected to take part at the International Design Biennial in St. Etienne, in 2006.

Conceptual art
Serbian art